Forbidden Fruit is a 2000 German/Zimbabwean short film written and directed by Sue Maluwa-Bruce, Beate Kunath and Yvonne Zückmantel. Filmed in Zimbabwe, the film depicts the romantic relationship between two women, and the aftermath of the discovery of their relationship.

Plot
In a rural village in Zimbabwe, a single woman, Nongoma, and her married neighbour, Tsitsi, fall in love. When their lesbian relationship is discovered, Nongoma flees to the city. When they are reunited by chance two years later, the women decide to move together to a village where nobody knows them.

Production
Forbidden Fruit was filmed on location in Mutare, Zimbabwe. When the original cast members resigned fearing a homophobic backlash, Maluwa-Bruce recruited friends and family members to act in the film.

Reception
Forbidden Fruit won the Teddy Jury Award at the 2001 Berlin International Film Festival and the FEMMEDIA Prize for Best Short at the Identities Queer Film Festival in Vienna. It received a Special Jury Mention at the Lesbian & Gay Film Festival in Milan.

Nicole Blizzard of Technodyke called the film wonderful and Amy Villarejo of Cornell University called it "a moving call to queer, global solidarity". PlanetOut called it "the most gutsy film to be shown at the Berlinale". Daniel Somerville said "it may not
be the best film ever made but it certainly breaks ground in a Zimbabwean context."

Further reading
 Botha, Martin P.: "Queering African Film Aesthetics: A Survey from the 1950s to 2003". In: Ukadike, Nwachukwu Frank (ed.): Critical Approaches to African Cinema Discourse. Lexington Books, Lanham, Boulder, New York, Toronto, Plymouth 2014. , p. 84.

References

External links
 
 Filmwerkstatt Chemnitz 
 Forbidden Fruit on Beate Kunaths Homepage
 Forbidden Fruit at Internationale Filmfestspiele Berlin

2000 films
2000 short documentary films
2000 LGBT-related films
Documentary films about lesbians
German LGBT-related films
German short documentary films
LGBT-related short films
Shona-language films
Zimbabwean documentary films
Zimbabwean LGBT-related films
2000s English-language films
Zimbabwean short films
2000s German films